James Albert Edward Hamilton, 3rd Duke of Abercorn  (30 November 1869 – 12 September 1953), styled Marquess of Hamilton between 1885 and 1913, was a British peer and Unionist politician. He was the first Governor of Northern Ireland, a post he held between 1922 and 1945. He was a great-grandfather of Diana, Princess of Wales.

Background and education
Born in Hamilton Place, Piccadilly, London, he was the eldest son of James Hamilton, 2nd Duke of Abercorn, and godson of the Prince of Wales. His mother Lady Mary Anna was the fourth daughter of Richard Curzon-Howe, 1st Earl Howe. He was educated at Eton and subsequently served first in the Royal Inniskilling Fusiliers until 1892 when he joined the 1st Life Guards. Hamilton was later transferred as major to the North Irish Horse.

In early 1901, he accompanied his father on a special diplomatic mission to announce the accession of King Edward to the governments of Denmark, Sweden and Norway, Russia, Germany, and Saxony.

Political career
In the 1900 general election, Hamilton stood successfully as Unionist candidate for Londonderry City, and three years later he became Treasurer of the Household, a post he held until the fall of Balfour's Conservative administration in 1905. After serving for a time as an Opposition whip, Hamilton succeeded his father as third Duke of Abercorn in 1913. In 1922 he was appointed governor of the newly created Northern Ireland. He also served as Lord Lieutenant of Tyrone from 1917 until his death, having previously been a Deputy Lieutenant for County Donegal. Abercorn proved a popular royal representative in Northern Ireland, and was reappointed to the post in 1928 after completing his first term of office. In 1931, he declined the offer of the governor generalship of Canada, and three years later he was again reappointed governor for a third term. He remained in this capacity until his resignation in July 1945.

Abercorn was made the last non-royal Knight of the Most Illustrious Order of Saint Patrick in 1922, and six years later became a Knight of the Most Noble Order of the Garter. In the latter year, he was also the recipient of an honorary degree from the Queen's University of Belfast, and received the Royal Victorian Chain in 1945, the same year he was sworn of the Privy Council.

Family and children
Abercorn married Lady Rosalind Cecilia Caroline Bingham (1869–1958), only daughter of Charles Bingham, 4th Earl of Lucan and his wife Lady Cecilia Catherine Gordon-Lennox (1838–1910, daughter of Charles Lennox, 5th Duke of Richmond) at St. Paul's Church, Knightsbridge, on 1 November 1894. They had three daughters and two sons:
 Lady Mary Cecilia Rhodesia Hamilton (1896–1984), who married twice, firstly in 1917 Capt/Maj. Robert Orlando Rudolph Kenyon-Slaney (1892–1965), with whom she divorced in 1930, and, secondly, in 1930 to Sir John Gilmour, 2nd Baronet. With her first husband she had two daughters and a son, and with her second husband one son.
 Lady Cynthia Elinor Beatrix Hamilton (1897–1972), who married in 1919 Albert Edward John Spencer, 7th Earl Spencer (1892–1975). They had a son and two daughters. By their son they became grandparents of Diana, Princess of Wales.
 Lady Katherine Hamilton (1900–1985), who married in 1930 Lt.-Col. Sir Reginald Henry Seymour (1878–1938), a descendant of the 1st Marquess of Hertford.
 James Edward Hamilton, 4th Duke of Abercorn (1904–1979)
 Lord Claud David Hamilton (1907–1968), who worked as a barrister in the Inner Temple, and who in 1946 married Genesta Mary Heath. He was her third husband; they had no children.

Abercorn died at his London home in 1953, and was buried at Baronscourt in County Tyrone.

Ancestry

Notes

References

External links
 
 

1869 births
1953 deaths
Deputy Lieutenants of Donegal
103
Knights of Grace of the Order of St John
Knights of St Patrick
Knights of the Garter
Lord-Lieutenants of Tyrone
Members of the Privy Council of Northern Ireland
Members of the Privy Council of the United Kingdom
Members of the Senate of Northern Ireland 1921–1925
Hamilton, James
North Irish Horse officers
British Life Guards officers
Treasurers of the Household
Hamilton, James
Hamilton, James
Hamilton, James
Hamilton, James
UK MPs who inherited peerages
Ulster Unionist Party members of the Senate of Northern Ireland